Raleigh is the capital of the U.S. state of North Carolina, named after Sir Walter Raleigh.

Raleigh may also refer to:

Places

Australia
Raleigh, New South Wales

Canada
Raleigh, Newfoundland and Labrador

United Kingdom
Raleigh, Pilton, a historic manor in North Devon

United States
 Raleigh, Florida
 Raleigh, Georgia
 Raleigh, Illinois
 Raleigh, Indiana
 Raleigh, Iowa
 Raleigh, Mississippi
 Raleigh, North Dakota
 Raleigh, North Carolina
 Raleigh, Memphis, a suburban community in Tennessee
 Raleigh, West Virginia
 Raleigh County, West Virginia

Organizations
 Raleigh Bicycle Company, a bicycle manufacturer
 Raleigh International, a UK-based educational development charity
 Roman Catholic Diocese of Raleigh, a Roman Catholic diocese that covers the eastern half of the U.S. state of North Carolina

Ships
CSS Raleigh (1861), a gunboat
CSS Raleigh (1864), an ironclad ram
HMS Raleigh (1806), an 18-gun Cruizer class brig-sloop
HMS Raleigh (1845), a 50-gun fourth rate
HMS Raleigh (1873), an iron screw frigate
HMS Raleigh (1919), a Hawkins-class heavy cruiser
HMS Raleigh (shore establishment), the basic training establishment of the Royal Navy, in Torpoint
USS Raleigh (1776), a 32-gun sailing frigate
USS Raleigh (C-8), a protected cruiser commissioned in 1894
USS Raleigh (CL-7), a light cruiser commissioned in 1924
USS Raleigh (LPD-1), an amphibious transport dock in service from 1962 to 1992

People
Raleigh (name), a page for people with the given and surname "Raleigh"

Other uses 
 Raleigh (band), a Canadian experimental indie-rock band from Calgary
 Raleigh (typeface)
 Raleigh Becket, protagonist of the film Pacific Rim

See also 
 Raleigh Court, Roanoke, Virginia, a neighborhood
 Raleigh Tavern a historic tavern related to the American Revolution in Colonial Williamsburg, Virginia
 Raleigh Township (disambiguation)
 Rally (disambiguation)
 Rayleigh (disambiguation)
 Sir Walter Raleigh (essay), by Henry David Thoreau
 Sir Walter Raleigh Hotel, a historic hotel in downtown Raleigh, North Carolina